"The Ballad of Casey Jones", also known as "Casey Jones, the Brave Engineer" or simply "Casey Jones", is a traditional American folk song about railroad engineer Casey Jones and his death at the controls of the train he was driving.  It tells of how Jones and his fireman Sim Webb raced their locomotive to make up for lost time, but discovered another train ahead of them on the line, and how Jones remained on board to try to stop the train as Webb jumped to safety.  It is song number 3247 in the Roud Folk Song Index.

The song helped preserve the memory of Jones' feat down through the years in its 40 plus versions and enhanced Casey’s legendary status to the extent that he has even become something of a mythological figure like Pecos Bill or Paul Bunyan to the uninformed.  Books and pulp magazines about the railroad and its heroes helped to perpetuate his memory as well.

Soon after Casey’s death, the song was first sung by engine wiper and friend of Casey’s named Wallace Saunders to the tune of a popular song of the time known as "Jimmie Jones."  He was known to sing and whistle as he went about his work cleaning the steam engines.  In the words of Casey’s wife: "Wallace's admiration of Casey was little short of idolatry. He used to brag mightily about Mr. Jones even when Casey was only a freight engineer." But Saunders never had his original version copyrighted, and thus there is no way of knowing precisely what words he sang.

As railroaders stopped in Canton, Mississippi, they would pick up the song and pass it along. Soon it was a hit up and down the I.C. line.  But it was up to others with a profit motive to take it and rework it for a nationwide audience.  Illinois Central Engineer William Leighton appreciated the song's potential enough to tell his brothers Frank Leighton and Bert Leighton, who were vaudeville performers, about it. They took it and sang it in theaters around the country with a chorus they added. But apparently even they neglected to get it copyrighted.

Reportedly, Saunders received a bottle of gin for the use of the song. Nothing more was heard from him after this, and he is now known only for preserving the legend of Casey Jones.

Finally, with vaudeville performers T. Lawrence Seibert credited with the lyrics and Eddie Newton with the music, it was published and offered for sale in 1909 with the title "Casey Jones, The Brave Engineer". As their intent was to entertain, it was hailed on the cover of the sheet music as the "Greatest Comedy Hit In Years" and "The Only Comedy Railroad Song." This version was the one that was strenuously objected to by Casey's widow, for making her appear to have been unfaithful to Casey. The offending lines read: "Mrs. Jones sat on her bed a sighing/Just received a message that Casey was dying/ Said go to bed children and hush your crying/Cause you got another papa on the Salt Lake line." This is similar to a line in the song "Duncan and Brady".  She spent her remaining years refuting those lines, once saying "That devil hasn't shown up in 58 years!"

By World War I, dozens of versions had been published and millions of copies were sold, securing the memory of a new American folk hero. Poet Carl Sandburg called the song "Casey Jones, the Brave Engineer" the "greatest ballad ever written".  Casey Jones figures in many railroad songs, such as "Freight Train Boogie", by the Delmore Brothers.

Recordings
Collins & Harlan (1910, Columbia A907)
Billy Murray as "The Ballad of Casey Jones" (1912, Edison Blue Amberol 1550)
Furry Lewis as "Kassie Jones" (1928, Anthology of American Folk Music)
American Folklife recording (1932)
Pete Seeger (1956, reissued 1992, American Industrial Ballads)
The Dixieaires (1949)
Burl Ives (1954, Decca 29129)
Johnny Cash
Milt Okun (1957, Baton BL1203)
The Golden Gate Quartet (1960)
Bing Crosby included the song in a medley on his album 101 Gang Songs (1961)
Merrill Jay Singers (1961, Songs of the Railroad, Viking Record Company)
Elizabeth Cotten (1965, Smithsonian Folkways Records, Vol. 3: When I'm Gone)
Robert DeCormier Singers (Arabesque Z6675)
Joe Hickerson as Drive Dull Care Away (2002, Folk-Legacy Records)
Spike Jones and his City Slickers – with new lyrics about Casey Jones Jr. who serves as a bombardier during World War II
Mississippi John Hurt

"The Ballad of Casey Jones" is not to be confused with the song "Casey Jones" by the Grateful Dead, or several other songs on the subject (see Casey Jones#Casey Jones references in music.)

See also
List of train songs

References

External links
Ballad of Casey Jones
 The Ballad Of Casey Jones, Wallace Saunders lyrics

Other sources
"A Treasury of American Folklore," by B. A. Botkin, (American Legacy Press, NT, 1944) pp. 241–246) 
 April 1932, Erie Railroad Magazine, vol 28, no. 2, p12

American folk songs
Songs about Casey Jones
Mississippi John Hurt songs
Train wreck ballads
Performing arts pages with videographic documentation
Songs based on American history
Songs about trains
1909 songs